Hisham Fadel Sulliman (born in 1978) is an Arab-Israeli  actor. He is best known for his role in the Israeli drama film Bethlehem, and as Taufiq Hammed in the Israeli political thriller television series Fauda.

Biography
Sulliman was born and raised in Nazareth, Israel, to a Palestinian Arab-Muslim family. As a child, he started acting at a community theatre. In 1997, he moved to Tel Aviv to study acting at the 'Yoram Levinstein Studio', from which he graduated in 2000.

In 2007 he co-founded the Nazareth local Fringe theatre. Sulliman also took part in numerous plays in the Al-Midan and the El-Hakawati theaters.

Sulliman is probably best known for his role in the Israeli 2013 drama film Bethlehem, and his role in the Israeli political thriller television series Fauda as Taufiq Hammed, nicknamed "The Panther", a former official member of the Palestinian terror organization  Hamas.

Sulliman is married to Rahik Haj Yahi, an Arab actress from Tayibe, they met in 2002 during a production of a play. They have three children, and live in Nazareth, Israel.

In 2021, he started working on the TV show Beauty Queen of Jerusalem.

Filmography

Film
Munich - 2005
The Little Traitor - 2007
Bethlehem - 2013
Stay Alive - 2013
Last Band in Lebanon - 2016
Wounded Land - 2016

Television
Fauda - 2015 (12 episodes)
A Good Family
Arab Labor
Ha-Chaim Ze Lo Hacol
Shemesh
Homeland
The Girl from Oslo (TV series)
Beauty Queen of Jerusalem

External links

References

Israeli male stage actors
Israeli male film actors
Israeli male television actors
Arab citizens of Israel
1978 births
Living people
21st-century Israeli male actors
People from Nazareth
Israeli Muslims
Big Brother (franchise) contestants